"Je t'adore" ("I adore you") is a song by Belgian singer Kate Ryan. It was the  entry in the Eurovision Song Contest 2006, performed in English (with only the title in French). It was the seventh song to be performed in this contest and the 999th by counting all songs which had ever performed on Eurovision Song Contest. "Je t'adore" was released in 2006 as the lead single from Ryan's third studio album Alive (2006).

Composition
The song is composed in a key of F mixolydian, and has 131 beats per minute.

Song information

On the night, it was performed seventh, following 's Luiz Ejlli with "Zjarr e ftohtë" and preceding 's Brian Kennedy with "Every Song Is a Cry for Love".

The song itself is a love song in a disco style, with Ryan expressing her love and occasionally lapsing into French to sing .

The performance was notable on the night for the neon-tubed microphone stands that Ryan variously sang and danced with, each being moved around by the backing dancers. Pre-contest publicity had credited Ryan with a strong song, however this was not borne out in voting. As a small consolation, the presenter charged with announcing the Belgian votes on the night of the final held up a cardboard sign with the words "We Love Kate Ryan" on it – prompting derisive comments from BBC commentator Terry Wogan, who during the contest said the song sounded like "shut that door" instead of je t'adore.

Formats and track listings
 Belgian CD Single
"Je t'adore" (Eurovision mix) - 3:03
"Driving Away" (Radio edit) - 3:42
 German CD Single
"Je t'adore" (Main version) - 4:08
"Je t'adore" (Eurovision ix) - 3:03
"Je t'adore" (Extended version) - 5:56
"Je t'adore" (J-D alternative mix) - 3:24
"Driving Away" (Radio edit) - 3:40
"Je t'adore" (Music video)

Official versions and remixes

"Je T'Adore" (Main version)
"Je T'Adore" (French version)
"Je T'Adore" (J-D alternative mix)
"Je T'Adore" (Eurovision mix)
"Je T'Adore" (Radio edit)
"Je T'Adore" (Extended mix)

Charts

External links
 Official Eurovision Song Contest site, history by year, 2006.
 Detailed info and lyrics, The Diggiloo Thrush, "Je t'adore".

References

External links
 

Eurovision songs of 2006
Eurovision songs of Belgium
Kate Ryan songs
Songs written by Lisa Greene
Songs written by Niklas Bergwall
Songs written by Niclas Kings
2006 songs
Songs written by Kate Ryan
EMI Records singles